Bosque Seco del Patía Fauna and Flora Sanctuary, or Patia Dry Forest, is a wildlife sanctuary in Colombia. It is located on the border between the Nariño Department and the Cauca Department.

National parks of Colombia
Wildlife sanctuaries of South America
Geography of Nariño Department
Geography of Cauca Department